Chan Kwong Beng (born 2 June 1988 in Perak) is a Malaysian badminton player, and in 2017 he started to represent the United States. In 2013, he won the men's singles competition at the Vietnam International under coach Li Mao at the Kawasaki badminton club in Petaliang Jaya.

Achievements

BWF International Challenge/Series
Men's singles

Men's doubles

 BWF International Challenge tournament
 BWF International Series tournament

References

External links 
 

1988 births
Living people
People from Perak
Malaysian sportspeople of Chinese descent
Malaysian male badminton players
American male badminton players
Badminton players at the 2010 Asian Games
Asian Games competitors for Malaysia
Competitors at the 2007 Southeast Asian Games
Southeast Asian Games bronze medalists for Malaysia
Southeast Asian Games medalists in badminton